Lin Au, also known as Lin O ( or ), is a Hakka village in Lam Tsuen, Tai Po District, Hong Kong. It is one of the 23 villages in Lam Tsuen Valley.

Lin Au is divided into two small villages, Lin Au Lee Uk and Lin Au Cheng Uk.

Administration
Lin Au Lee Uk and Lin Au Cheng Uk are recognized villages under the New Territories Small House Policy.

References

External links

 Delineation of area of existing village Lin Au, Cheng Uk (Tai Po) for election of resident representative (2019 to 2022)
 Delineation of area of existing village Lin Au, Lei Uk (Tai Po) for election of resident representative (2019 to 2022)
 Antiquities Advisory Board. Pictures of Cheng Ancestral Hall

Villages in Tai Po District, Hong Kong
Lam Tsuen